Ornithocephalus manabina is a species of orchid in the genus Orchidaceae.

References

manabina